Mzab may refer to:

 M'zab, region in Algeria
 Mzab (Moroccan tribe), a tribe in Morocco
 Mzab gundi, species of rodent
 Mzab-Wargla, language